AHLA may refer to:

American Health Lawyers Association, a non-profit professional association for attorneys and other professionals in the healthcare field
Amazones d'Hier, Lesbiennes d'Aujourd'hui (Amazons of Yesterday, Lesbians of Today), a quarterly French language magazine
Asian Health Literacy Association, an association which aims to provide an overview of the health literacy status in Asia
American Hotel and Lodging Association, an industry trade group that advocates for hotels and other entities that provide lodging services

See also
Ahla, a village in Pakistan
 Ahlu, village in Lahore, Pakistan, ancestral place of the Ahluwalia